Sir Walter Leslie Farrer KCVO (30 January 1900 – 6 March 1984) was a British solicitor.  He was Private Solicitor to both King George VI and Queen Elizabeth II.  He married Marjorie Laura Pollock, daughter of Ernest Pollock, 1st Viscount Hanworth.  They had one son, Sir Matthew Farrer (also a partner at Farrer & Co), and one daughter.

He was educated at Rugby School and Balliol College, Oxford.

He wrote a letter to the Times, about Ernest Gellner.

References

Sources
 FARRER, Sir (Walter) Leslie’, Who Was Who, A & C Black, 1920–2008; online edn, Oxford University Press, Dec 2007 accessed 22 May 2011

1900 births
1984 deaths
People educated at Rugby School
Alumni of Balliol College, Oxford
British solicitors